The Mattachine Steps, also known as the Cove Avenue stairway, is an outdoor staircase in Silver Lake, Los Angeles, in the U.S. state of California, dedicated to the Mattachine Society in 2012 in memory of Harry Hay, who cofounded the gay rights group.

References

External links
 

LGBT monuments and memorials in the United States
Monuments and memorials in Los Angeles
Silver Lake, Los Angeles